The following are the winners of the 20th annual (1993) Origins Award, presented at Origins 1994:

External links
 1993 Origins Awards Winners

1993 awards
1993 awards in the United States
Origins Award winners